Euan Aitken (born 16 June 1995) is a Scotland international rugby league footballer who plays as a er or  for the Dolphins the NRL. 

He previously played for the St. George Illawarra Dragons and the New Zealand Warriors in the National Rugby League and has played for the Prime Minister's XIII and Country NSW.

Background
Aitken was born in Pambula, New South Wales, Australia. He is of Scottish descent through his paternal grandfather, Andrew, Latvian descent through his paternal grandmother, Regina, and Polish descent through his paternal grandmother's mother. 

He played his junior rugby league for the Merimbula-Pambula Bulldogs and Shellharbour Sharks. He was then signed by the St. George Illawarra Dragons.

Playing career

Early career
In 2013 and 2014, Aitken played for the St. George Illawarra Dragons' NYC team. In September and October 2013, he played for the Australian Schoolboys. On 28 April 2014, he was named to play for the New South Wales under-20s team to play Queensland, but had to pull out due to injury. On 18 October 2014, he played for the Junior Kangaroos against the Junior Kiwis. At the end of 2014, he was named the Dragons' NYC Player of the Year. In 2015, he moved on to the Dragons' New South Wales Cup team, Illawarra Cutters.

Dragons (2015 - 2020)
On 31 January and 1 February, Aitken played for the Dragons in the 2015 NRL Auckland Nines. In Round 3 of the 2015 NRL season, he made his NRL début for the Dragons against the Canberra Raiders, playing at centre in the Dragons' 22–20 win at Canberra Stadium. On 23 March, he re-signed with the Dragons on a two-year contract. In Round 6 against the Canterbury-Bankstown Bulldogs, he scored his first NRL career try in the Dragons' 31–6 win at ANZ Stadium. He finished off his début year in the NRL having played in 23 matches and scoring six tries for the Dragons. On 26 September, he played for the Prime Minister's XIII against Papua New Guinea, playing off the interchange bench and scoring a try in his team's 40-12 win at Port Moresby.

In February 2016, Aitken played for the Dragons in the 2016 NRL Auckland Nines. On 8 May, he played for New South Wales Country against New South Wales City, where he played at centre and scored a try. In Round 10 against the Canberra Raiders, he scored a try off a wayward pass from Canberra Raiders  Jack Wighton, just on the halfway siren in golden-point extra-time to win the match for the Dragons 16–12.

In 2017, Aitken was forced to miss Scotland's 2017 World Cup campaign due to injury.

Aitken made 23 appearances during the 2018 season, and scored 10 tries for St George as the club finished 7th on the table at the end of the regular season.  St George had led the competition after 16 rounds before losing 6 of their last 9 games which was reminiscent to their 2017 season.  Aitken missed out on playing in the club's finals campaign which saw them upset the Brisbane Broncos in week one of the finals before being eliminated the following week by South Sydney 13-12.

In Round 21 of the 2019 NRL season, Aitken made his 100th first grade appearance and scored a try as St George defeated the Gold Coast 40-28 at Kogarah Oval.

On August 11, 2020, Aitken signed a three-year deal to join the New Zealand Warriors starting in 2021.

Warriors (2021 - 2022)
Aitken made his debut for New Zealand in round 1 of the 2021 NRL season against the Gold Coast at Central Coast Stadium.  In the same match, Aitken picked up an ankle injury and was ruled out for four months.

In round 12 against North Queensland, Aitken scored two tries in a 29-28 defeat. In round 20, he scored two tries for New Zealand in a 18-16 victory over the Wests Tigers.

In March 2022, it was revealed that Aitken would be granted a release from his Warriors contract at the end of 2022, Aitken stating that he needs to remain living in Australia for family reasons. He later signed a two-year deal with the Dolphins, an upcoming club in 2023.
Aitken made a total of 21 appearances for the New Zealand club as they finished 15th on the table.

Dolphins (2023 - present)
Aitken played in the inaugural game for the Dolphins, playing against the Roosters (round 1, 2023) at Suncorp Stadium.

References

External links

St. George Illawarra Dragons profile
Dragons profile
NRL profile
Scotland profile
Scotland RL profile

1995 births
Living people
Australian rugby league players
Australian people of Scottish descent
Australian people of Polish descent
Australian people of Latvian descent
Scotland national rugby league team players
St. George Illawarra Dragons players
New Zealand Warriors players
Dolphins (NRL) players
Prime Minister's XIII players
Country New South Wales Origin rugby league team players
Junior Kangaroos players
Illawarra Cutters players
Rugby league centres
Rugby league players from New South Wales
Rugby league wingers